Creep City may refer to:

 "Creep City", a song on Jake Shears (album) (2018)
 "Creep City", a song on Phantom and the Ghost (2014)